Marsilio Rossi (3 August 1916 – 16 December 1942) was an Italian sprinter. He competed in the men's 4 × 400 metres relay at the 1936 Summer Olympics.

References

External links
 

1916 births
1942 deaths
Athletes (track and field) at the 1936 Summer Olympics
Italian male sprinters
Olympic athletes of Italy
Place of birth missing
Italian Athletics Championships winners
Italian military personnel killed in World War II
Athletes from Rio de Janeiro (city)